The 2012 Africa Cup of Nations Final was a football match that took place on 12 February 2012 between Zambia and Ivory Coast. The match took place at the Stade d'Angondjé in Libreville, Gabon to determine the winner of the 2012 Africa Cup of Nations, the football championship of Africa organized by the Confederation of African Football (CAF). This stadium is located near the spot where most of the Zambian national team died when their aeroplane crashed in 1993. The kickoff time was delayed by 30 minutes to 20:30.

Zambia won the title for the first time by beating Ivory Coast 8–7 on penalties after the only goalless draw the entire tournament.

Background
This was the third appearance in the final for Zambia; the "Copper Bullets" lost in 1974 and 1994. After a surprising start and a win over Senegal, they drew with Libya before winning the deciding match against the host Equatorial Guinea and winning the group. In the quarterfinals they won 3–0 against Sudan and shocked Ghana as they defeated them 1–0 in the semifinals. Both Christopher Katongo and Emmanuel Mayuka scored three goals in the first five matches to help Zambia to reach the final.  The match was an emotional one for Zambia, as the stadium in Libreville was just kilometres away from the site of the 1993 Zambia national football team air disaster, in which 18 players were killed.

Ivory Coast also appeared in their third final. They won it in 1992 and lost in 2006. The "Elephants" had gone through the tournament so far without conceding a goal and winning all of their matches. It started with a victory against Sudan, followed by two wins against Burkina Faso and Angola, the latter one without some of the best players. The quarterfinal was won against co-host Equatorial Guinea, before Mali was beaten 1–0. Didier Drogba joins Katongo and Mayuka with three goals himself at the top of the goalscorers.

Route to the final

Match details

Details

Assistant referees:
Bechir Hassani (Tunisia)
Evarist Menkouande (Cameroon)
Fourth official:
Eddy Maillet (Seychelles)

References

External links
Official Site

Final
2012
Africa Cup of Nations Final
2012
2012
Africa Cup of Nations Final 2012
Africa
Sports competitions in Libreville
21st century in Libreville
February 2012 sports events in Africa